MV Maid of Glencoul is a Highland Council ferry, previously at Kylesku and now at Corran.

History
Maid of Glencoul was built in Ardrossan for Highland Council in 1976.

Layout
Maid of Glencoul has a single car deck with offset bow and stern ramps.

Service
Built for Kylesku, she was the first vessel there capable of carrying fully loaded commercial vehicles. After the opening of the Kylesku Bridge, in 1984, she became the Corran Ferry. She is now the backup vessel at Corran, providing cover for 's annual overhaul, and for any breakdowns.

Footnotes

Ferries of Scotland
1975 ships